Poczet ("fellowship" or "retinue"; plural poczty) was the smallest organized unit of soldiers in the  and later also the Grand Ducal Lithuanian Army from the 15th until the 18th century. The name of a medium or heavy-cavalry soldiers in poczet was pocztowy.

In the cavalry, each poczet was commanded by a Companion or Armoured companion. Several Poczets were combined to form larger units like a Banner (the equivalent of a Western Company). In this context the poczet is the equivalent of the medieval Lances fournies.

Pocztowy was an assistant and subordinate of the Companion, in some respects similar to more ancient knight's servant - page or squire. He was armoured like his superior, but fought in the second or third line and was responsible for guarding his back and flanks in a battle.

See also

 Offices in the Polish–Lithuanian Commonwealth

Further reading
 Richard Brzezinski, Polish Winged Hussar 1576-1775 (Warrior Series 94), Oxford: Osprey, 2006. 
 Richard Brzezinski, Polish Armies 1569-1696, 2 vols, London: Osprey Publishing, 1987,  and 

Polish cavalry
Military history of Poland